The Ambassador of the United Kingdom to Ecuador is the United Kingdom's foremost diplomatic representative in Ecuador, and head of the UK's diplomatic mission in Ecuador. The official title is His Britannic Majesty's Ambassador to the Republic of Ecuador.

Until 1935 the British Minister to Peru was also accredited to Ecuador, and the senior British diplomat (chargé d’affaires) at Quito was Consul-General. From 1935–1943 the title of the head of mission was Minister Resident, and from 1943–1950 Minister Plenipotentiary. The post was upgraded to Ambassador in 1950.

List of heads of mission

Minister Resident
1935–1937: Hugh Stanford London (previously Consul-General)
1937–1941: Guy Bullock
1941–1943: Leslie Hughes-Hallett

Envoy Extraordinary and Minister Plenipotentiary
1943–1946: Leslie Hughes-Hallett
1946–1947: Colin Edmond
1947–1950: John Carvell

Ambassador Extraordinary and Plenipotentiary
1950–1951: John Carvell
1951–1955: Norman Mayers
1955–1959: Herbert Gamble
1959–1962: Gerald Meade
1962–1967: Gerard Corley Smith
1967–1970: Gordon Jackson
1970–1974: Peter Mennell
1974–1977: Norman Ernest Cox
1977–1981: John Hickman
1981–1985: Adrian Buxton
1985–1989: Michael Atkinson
1989–1993: Frank Wheeler
1993–1997: Richard Lavers
1997–2000: John Forbes-Meyler
2000–2002: Ian Gerken
2002–2007: Richard Lewington
2007–2008: Bernard Whiteside
2008–2012: Linda Cross
2012–2016: Patrick Mullee
2016–2020: Katharine Ward

2020–: Chris Campbell

References

External links
UK and Ecuador, gov.uk

Ecuador
 
United Kingdom ambassadors